The 1901–02 Scottish Division One season was won by Rangers by two points over nearest rival Celtic.

League table

Results

References 

 Scottish Football Archive
 Rsssf

1901–02 Scottish Football League
Scottish Division One seasons
Scottish